Job Submission Description Language is an extensible XML specification from the Global Grid Forum for the description of simple tasks to non-interactive computer execution systems. Currently at version 1.0 (released November 7, 2005), the specification focuses on the description of computational task submissions to traditional high-performance computer systems like batch schedulers.

Description
JSDL describes the submission aspects of a job, and does not attempt to describe the state of running or historic jobs.  Instead, JSDL includes descriptions of:

 Job name, description
 Resource requirements that computers must have to be eligible for scheduling, such as total RAM available, total swap available, CPU clock speed, number of CPUs, Operating System, etc.
 Execution limits, such as the maximum amount of CPU time, wallclock time, or memory that can be consumed.
 File staging, or the transferring of files before or after execution.
 Command to execute, including its command-line arguments, environment variables to define, stdin/stdout/stderr redirection, etc.

Software support
The following software is known to currently support JSDL:

 GridWay meta scheduler
 Platform LSF 7
 UNICORE 6
 GridSAM  
 Windows HPC Server 2008
 GRIA 
 Genesis II Project  http://genesis2.virginia.edu/wiki/
 Advanced Resource Connector (ARC v0.6 and above)
 XtreemOS Grid Operating System 
 EMOTIVE Cloud 
 IBM Tivoli Workload Scheduler Tivoli Workload Scheduler

See also 
 Resource Specification Language (See The Globus Resource Specification Language RSL v1.0)
 Distributed Resource Management Application API

External links 

 
 JSDL working group project page
 Windows HPC Server 2008
Grid computing
XML-based standards
Computer-related introductions in 2005